Anas Ouahim (born 23 September 1997) is a professional footballer who plays as a midfielder for Eerste Divisie club Heracles Almelo. Born in Germany, Ouahim represents Morocco internationally.

Club career
In May 2018, VfL Osnabrück announced Ouahim would join the club for the 2018–19 season from 1. FC Köln. He signed a two-year contract until 2020.

On 31 January 2021, Ouahim signed a 2.5-year contract with Heracles Almelo in Eredivisie.

International career
Ouahim was born in Germany and is of Moroccan descent. Ouahim represented the Morocco U23s in a 1–1 tie with the Mali U23s on 8 September 2019.

References

1997 births
Living people
Sportspeople from Leverkusen
Moroccan footballers
Morocco youth international footballers
German footballers
German people of Moroccan descent
German sportspeople of African descent
Association football midfielders
Citizens of Morocco through descent
1. FC Köln II players
1. FC Köln players
VfL Osnabrück players
SV Sandhausen players
1. FC Kaiserslautern players
Heracles Almelo players
Regionalliga players
Bundesliga players
2. Bundesliga players
3. Liga players
Eredivisie players
Eerste Divisie players
Moroccan expatriate footballers
Expatriate footballers in the Netherlands
Moroccan expatriate sportspeople in the Netherlands
German expatriate footballers
German expatriate sportspeople in the Netherlands
Footballers from North Rhine-Westphalia